Central Halmahera Regency is a regency (on Halmahera Island) in North Maluku Province, Indonesia.  It covers a land area of 2,485.76 km2, and had a population of 42,815 at the 2010 Census and 56,802 at the 2020 Census; the official estimate as at mid 2021 was 57,809.ref>Badan Pusat Statistik, Jakarta, 2022.</ref> The capital lies at Weda.

Economy 
The regency is site of the Weda Bay Industrial Park, a nickel mining and processing site.

Administration 
The regency was divided at 2010 into eight districts (kecamatan), but subsequently two further kecamatan have been created (Weda Timur and Patani Timur). The districts are tabulated below with their areas and their populations at the 2010 Census and the 2020 Census, together with the official estimates as at mid 2021.ref>Badan Pusat Statistik, Jakarta, 2022.</ref> The table also includes the locations of the district administrative centres, the number of villages (rural desa and urban kelurahan) in each district, and its postal code.

Notes: (a) includes 24 small offshore islands. (b) includes 2 offshore islands (Pulau Mintu, Pulau Tete). 
(c) the 2010 population for East Weda District is included with the figure for North Weda District, from which it was cut out.
(d) the 2010 population for East Patani District is included with the figure for North Patani District, from which it was cut out.
(e) includes 4 offshore islands (Pulau Jiu, Pulau Liwo, Pulau Mailiyet, Pulau Sayafi).
(f) includes 3 offshore islands (Pulau Moor, Pulau Weilon, Pulau Witimdi).
(g) comprises 9 islands (Pulau Fau, Pulau Gebe, Pulau Kiyas, Pulau Piyai, Pulau Sain, Pulau Tapau Kali, Pulau Tapau Piai, Pulau Uta, Pulau Yoi) lying southeast of the Patani Peninsula.

References 

Regencies of North Maluku
Halmahera